Bumpers is a surname. It may refer to:

Betty Bumpers (1925–2018), American activist, First Lady of Arkansas, from 1971 to 1975 as wife of Dale Bumpers 
Dale Bumpers (1925–2016), American politician, Governor of Arkansas (1971–1975), Senator (1975–1999)

See also
Dale Bumpers College of Agricultural, Food and Life Sciences
Bumper (disambiguation)